Jupiter Amphitheatre is a steep-walled valley in the eastern Morozumi Range of Victoria Land, Antarctica. The valley is occupied by a glacier and is entered between Sickle Nunatak and Mount Van Veen. It was mapped by the United States Geological Survey from surveys and U.S. Navy air photos, 1960–63, and was named by the New Zealand Geological Survey Antarctic Expedition during the 1967–68 season. The valley lies situated on the Pennell Coast, a portion of Antarctica lying between Cape Williams and Cape Adare.

References

Valleys of Victoria Land
Pennell Coast